Dolga Njiva (or Douganiwa) is a former village in eastern Slovenia in the Municipality of Trebnje. It is now part of the village of Gradišče pri Trebnjem. It is part of the traditional region of Lower Carniola and is now included in the Southeast Slovenia Statistical Region.

Geography
Dolga Njiva lies north of the village center of Gradišče pri Trebnjem. It stands on a ridge with vineyards above the valley of Pristava Creek. Babja Loka Creek flows through the valley immediately south of the settlement.

History
Dolga Njiva was annexed by Gradišče pri Trebnjem in 1953, ending its existence as a separate settlement.

References

External links
 Dolga Njiva (unlabeled) with Gradišče pri Trebnjem on Geopedia

Populated places in the Municipality of Trebnje
Former settlements in Slovenia